Carl Selph (born April 2, 1946) was an American politician in the state of Florida.

He served in the Florida House of Representatives for the 34th district from 1982 to 1986, as a Republican. Selph lives in Casselberry, Florida.

References

Living people
1946 births
Republican Party members of the Florida House of Representatives
People from Casselberry, Florida